Simphiwe Khonco is a South African professional boxer. He held the IBO mini-flyweight title from 2016 to 2019 and challenged for the WBA mini-flyweight title in 2015 and the WBC mini-flyweight title in 2019.

Boxing career

IBO mini-flyweight champion
Khonco was scheduled to fight Siyabonga Siyo for the vacant IBO mini-flyweight title on June 11, 2016 at the Emperors Palace in Kempton Park, Gauteng. The fight was a hometown bout for both competitors, as they both hailed from the Eastern Cape province of South African Republic. Khonco won the fight by unanimous decision, with two of the judges scoring the fight 118-110 in his favor, while the third judge scored the fight 116-112 for him.

Khonco made his first title defense against Nkosinathi Joyi on November 20, 2016. It was the first time that a world title fight was held in Mthatha, South Africa. Khonco won the fight by unanimous decision, with scores of 119-111, 119-111 and 118-112.

Khonco was scheduled to make his second IBO title defense against Lito Dante on June 10, 2017 at the Emperors Palace in Kempton Park, Gauteng. He won the fight by unanimous decision, with scores of 119-109, 119-109 and 118-110.

Khonco was scheduled to make his third title defense against Joey Canoy on December 2, 2018. The fight ended abruptly in the fourth round, after an accidental clash of heads left Khonco unable to continue. The fight was accordingly declared a no contest. Khonco subsequently refused a rematch, stating “We took this fight on our own but now we are moving foward [sic]".

Later mini-flyweight career
Khonco was scheduled to challenge the reigning WBC mini-flyweight title champion Wanheng Menayothin on October 25, 2019. Wanheng won the fight by unanimous decision, with scores of 118-109, 116-110, and 117-109.

Khonco faced Ariston Aton (9–3) on April 9, 2022, at the Superbowl in Sun City, on the undercard of the Athenkosi Dumezweni and Landi Ngxeke South African super flyweight title bout. He won the fight by unanimous decision, with scores of 100–90, 96–92 and 97–93.

Professional boxing record

References

External links

Living people
Mini-flyweight boxers
South African male boxers
People from Mthatha
Sportspeople from the Eastern Cape
1984 births